Ellen Eliza Blight (1833–1850), also known as Helen Bright, was an English lion tamer, known as "The Lion Queen", who was killed by a tiger while working in her uncle George Wombwell's menagerie, aged 17. Her shocking death made her a media sensation.

Early life 
Her father was John Blight (sometimes Bright), a bugler and bandleader in Wombwell's menagerie, and her mother was Elizabeth, sister of George Wombwell. She appeared as "The Lion Queen" in 1849, after a famous lion tamer Eleanor Chapman Sanger, who performed before Queen Victoria on 28 October 1847 at Windsor Castle, left George Wombwell's menagerie to join George Sanger’s travelling variety show.

Death 
On the evening of 11 January 1850 the George Wombwell's menagerie was at Chatham. A group of officers asked Bright to perform for them after the public show. She entered a cage which contained both a lion and a tiger, and touched the tiger's nose with her whip. It jumped at her and caught her dress, making her fall to the ground where it clawed her leg and then her throat. She was pulled out of the cage unconscious and attended by a doctor but died within a few minutes, in front of her parents and one of her brothers. The Daily News reported on January 14, 1850,

At the inquest, held in the Golden Lion hotel in Chatham, it was reported that the tiger "[held] her furiously by the neck, inserting the teeth of the upper jaw in her chin and closing his mouth, inflicting frightful injury in the throat by his fangs."

Blight was buried in Coventry where she shares a grave with her cousin William Wombwell, who had been killed by an elephant the previous year while working at Coventry Show Fair with a different menagerie. The tiger lived and was exhibited by Wombwell as "the animal which killed The Lion Queen".

Remembrance 
Her death was reported in national and local newspapers including the Daily News, Derby Mercury, Bristol Mercury, Rochester, Chatham and Strood Gazette, and the Dover Chronicle'', among others

A Staffordshire pottery figurine was produced, showing the Lion Queen with the lion and the tiger, although the tiger was sometimes painted spotted, as a leopard. An example is held in the National Portrait Gallery, as part of the Art Fund Popular Portraits Collection, and another in Rochester Guildhall Museum in Kent.

See also 

Animal training
Lion taming
Claire Heliot
Rose Flanders Bascom
Mabel Stark

References

Further reading 
 Everett, Shaun. "The British Lion Queens A History" (2013)
 Frost, Thomas. Circus Life and Circus Celebrities. London: Chatto and Windus, 1881.
 Tait, Peta. Fighting Nature: Travelling Menageries, Animal Acts and War Shows. Sydney: Sydney University Press, 2016.

1830s births
1850 deaths
British circus performers
Animal trainers
Deaths due to tiger attacks
19th-century English women
19th-century English people